Adarrus bellevoyei is a species of true bug belonging to the family Cicadellidae.

Synonym:
 Deltocephalus bellevoyei Puton, 1877 (= basionym)

References

Cicadellidae